Ancient Age is a brand of bourbon whiskey distilled in Frankfort, Kentucky at the Buffalo Trace Distillery.

History
In 1983 the Ancient Age brand was sold by Schenley to Age International.

Current products
 Ancient Age is a 36-month-old bourbon, bottled at 80 proof
 Ancient Age 90 is a variation of the traditional 36-month old bourbon, bottled at 90 proof
 Ancient Ancient Age 10 Star is bottled at 90 proof

The product line also includes Ancient Age Preferred blended whiskey, bottled at 80 proof.

Review
About some variation of the brand, food critic  Morgan Murphy said "The finish leapfrogs the tongue and goes straight to the throat."

References

Bourbon whiskey
Frankfort, Kentucky
Sazerac Company brands